mewithoutYou's Nice and Blue (pt. Two) 7" vinyl was released in the UK on Strange Addiction Records on September 24, 2007.  It features the song "Nice and Blue (Pt. 2)" from the mewithoutYou album "Brother, Sister", released worldwide in October, 2006.  The B-Side is a demo of the song "In A Sweater Poorly Knit" from the mewithoutYou album "Brother, Sister".

A Side - Nice and Blue (Pt. 2)
B Side - In A Sweater Poorly Knit (Demo Version)

Sources 
http://www.myspace.com/strangeaddictionrecords  
http://www.myspace.com/mewithoutyou
http://www.brother-sister.net
http://www.allmusicimport.com/1160395.html
Wikipedia entries on mewithoutYou and Brother, Sister

MewithoutYou albums